Henry May may refer to:
Henry May (American politician) (1816–1866), U.S. Representative from Maryland
Henry May (New Zealand politician) (1912–1995), New Zealand politician
Henry May (VC) (1885–1941), Scottish recipient of the Victoria Cross
Henry Allan Roughton May (1863–1930), English army officer
Henry F. May (1915–2012), American historian
Henry May (co-operative activist) (1867-1939), British co-operative activist
Henry John May (priest) (died 1893), Dean of St George's Cathedral, Georgetown, Guyana

See also
 Sir Francis Henry May (1860–1922), Governor of Hong Kong